Pak Djoko's flap-legged gecko (Gekko iskandari), also known commonly as Iskandar's wolf gecko, is a species of gecko, a lizard in the family  Gekkonidae. The species is endemic to Sulawesi.

Etymology
The specific name, iskandari, is in honour of Indonesian herpetologist Djoko Tjahono Iskandar.

Habitat
The preferred natural habitat of G. iskandari is forest.

Reproduction
G. iskandari is oviparous.

References

Further reading
Brown, Rafe M.; Supriatna, Jatna; Ota, Hidetoshi (2000). "Discovery of a New Species of Luperosaurus (Squamata; Gekkonidae) from Sulawesi, with a Phylogenetic Analysis of the Genus, and Comments on the Status of Luperosaurus serraticaudus ". Copeia 2000 (1): 191–209. (Luperosaurus iskandari, new species).

Gekko
Endemic fauna of Indonesia
Reptiles of Sulawesi
Reptiles described in 2000
Taxa named by Rafe M. Brown
Taxa named by Hidetoshi Ota